Jordan Magnuson (born 1984 in Tunisia) is an American independent game designer known for his minimalistic games, his games about travel, and for creating the indie game-focused website and community TIGSource. Among his games are Loneliness (2012), Freedom Bridge, and The Gametrekking Omnibus. Magnuson is also the founder of the game blog NecessaryGames.com.

References

Video game designers
Indie video game developers
Browser game developers
1984 births
Living people